Alpin Erroll Thomson  (14 May 1893 – 6 March 1960) played first-class cricket for Somerset County Cricket Club and the Royal Navy Cricket Club in 1922 and 1923. He also played international rugby union for Scotland. He was born in Perth, Western Australia and died at Hawridge, Chesham, Buckinghamshire. In some sources, his second name is spelled "Errol".

Family and background
Thomson's father, also called Alpin Thomson, was a colonial administrator in Western Australia at the time of his birth, being under-secretary for railways in the colony's government. His mother was, in one account, the daughter of the colonial secretary (equivalent to chief minister) of Western Australia from 1877 to 1880, Sir Roger Goldsworthy, and Goldsworthy left Alpin Thomson Sr and his wife with his unfinished house, called Lucknow, at Claremont, when he was posted to St Lucia in 1881. In 1933, Thomson's mother was cited in The Times as one of just nine remaining survivors of the Siege of Lucknow in 1857; if that is accurate, it explains the name of the house, but she is likely on grounds of age to have been Goldsworthy's step-daughter rather than a direct descendant. By the time of the First World War, Thomson's parents had retired to live at Wellington, Somerset.

Naval career
At the age of 13 in 1906, Thomson was sent to the Osborne Naval College on the Isle of Wight. He then moved on to the Britannia Royal Naval College at Dartmouth, Devon, where he won an award for swimming. He was then promoted to full lieutenant and given command of a minesweeper, . In 1917, he was awarded the Distinguished Service Cross "in recognition of (his) gallantry when one of H.M. minesweepers hit a mine": the minesweeper was Kempton, which sank off Dover after hitting a mine on 24 June 1917. He was awarded his medal personally by King George V on a visit to ships at Harwich in February 1918.

Thomson stayed in the Royal Navy at the end of the First World War and retrained as a physical training instructor. He was attached to the 1st Battle Squadron as an instructor, and later served on the aircraft carrier . As a lieutenant-commander, he was "lent" to the Royal Air Force in 1929 for "Observer and Instructional Duties" at RAF Leuchars in Scotland. He stayed in Scotland after this posting as the officer-instructor to the East Scottish division of the Royal Naval Volunteer Reserve from 1932 to 1936. He retired from the Navy in 1936 and retained the rank of Commander in retirement.

Rugby Union career

Amateur career

Thomson played rugby union for the Royal Navy before the First World War, appearing as a centre three-quarter in a match against Harlequins at New Year 1914. 

After the war, The Times carried reports on matches played by both the Royal Navy and by the United Services team in which Thomson featured.

Provincial career

He was "one of the outstanding players" in the trial match for the Scottish national side in January 1921, playing for the Scotland Possibles side.

International career

He had 3 international caps for Scotland, all in 1921.

On 12 January 1921 The Times reported his name among those picked to play for Scotland against France as a centre. The match itself was not a success for Thomson: he "was entirely out of form" and "mishandled the ball practically every time it came to him", said the report of the match, a 3–0 win for France. 

Thomson retained his place in the Scotland team for the next match against Wales at St Helen's, Swansea and was the subject of comment in The Times: "A. E. Thomson's mishandling of the ball was so atrocious that the Scottish selectors may, perhaps, be pardoned for assuming that his form was too bad to be real. One knows that he does possess the quality of pace." 

This match was won by Scotland and Thomson was the scorer of the first try; the report in The Times, which dwelt largely on pitch invasions that once brought the match to a halt and impeded play throughout, praised Thomson's speed, though again it said his handling was "weak". 

An ankle injury prevented Thomson playing in the next international match away to Ireland, when Scotland were beaten, but he was recalled for the final international of the season, the Calcutta Cup match against England at Inverleith. It was again not a happy experience: his miss of a pass let in the England wing three-quarter for a try, and the report in The Times said that both Thomson and his Royal Navy colleague Cecil MacKenzie, the other centre three-quarter, were "entirely at sea, both in attack and defence". 

Thomson did not play any further international rugby in subsequent seasons, though he continued to play for the United Services club, moving successfully to full back.

Cricket career

Thomson's first-class cricket career was brief. In May 1922, he played a single match for Somerset against Oxford University, batting as a tail-ender, failing to score a run, but taking three second innings wickets. Having earlier played in non-first-class matches for the Royal Navy team, he then turned out in a first-class game against The Army at Lord's, scoring 7 not out and 0 and taking one wicket. That was not quite the end of his first-class cricket career: at the end of the 1923 season, Somerset played Hampshire at the United Services Ground at Portsmouth, and Thomson was drafted into the team: he batted at No 11, was not out 0 in the first innings and "absent hurt" in the second, and did not bowl.

Later life
Thomson married Mary Elizabeth Lindsay, a widow from Fife, in Edinburgh in 1945. Reports in The Times across the 1930s and 1940s indicate Thomson played golf to a high standard at St Andrews. He retired to Hawridge Place, where he died in 1960. His wife died in 1982.

External links
 Alpin Thomson on scrum dot com.

References

1893 births
1960 deaths
Australian cricketers
Somerset cricketers
Royal Navy cricketers
Recipients of the Distinguished Service Cross (United Kingdom)
Scotland international rugby union players
Scottish rugby union players
Australian rugby union players
Cricketers from Perth, Western Australia
Rugby union players from Perth, Western Australia
People educated at the Royal Naval College, Osborne
United Services players
Royal Navy rugby union players
Scotland Possibles players